Nestor Pamipi Mendy (born 26 February 1995) is a Senegalese footballer who plays as either a right back or a defensive midfielder for the Senegal national team.

Club career

He trained with professional South African club Bidvest Wits in July 2016, but failed to earn a contract.

In July 2017, Mendy signed a three-year deal with Portuguese club União Madeira.

International career

Mendy was selected to represent the Senegal under-23 national team at the 2015 African Games in Brazzaville in September. He appeared in one match, it being the semifinal against Congo. They finished in first place, earning a gold medal for the country. The next month, he was again named in the 23-man squad selected to play in the 2015 Africa U-23 Cup of Nations. He appeared in three matches (against South Africa, Zambia and eventual champion Nigeria) as Senegal finished in fourth place.

Mendy made his senior international debut on 10 February 2016 during a friendly against Mexico in Miami.

Honours

Club
Douanes
 Senegal Premier League (1): 2014–15

International
Senegal
 African Games (1): 2015

References

External links

 
 Nestor Mendy at WhoScored
 

Living people
1995 births
Footballers from Dakar
Senegalese footballers
Senegalese expatriate footballers
Senegal international footballers
Association football defenders
Association football midfielders
AS Douanes (Senegal) players
Diambars FC players
C.F. União players
Liga Portugal 2 players
Campeonato de Portugal (league) players
AS Beauvais Oise players
Senegalese expatriate sportspeople in Portugal
Senegalese expatriate sportspeople in France
Expatriate footballers in Portugal
Expatriate footballers in France
African Games gold medalists for Senegal
African Games medalists in football
Competitors at the 2015 African Games